South Elgin is a village in Kane County, Illinois, United States. Per the 2020 census, the population was 23,865. In 2007, Money magazine named South Elgin as 82nd of 100 entries in its "America's Best Places to Live" edition and again in 2011 as 98th of 100 entries.

History
South Elgin was originally called "Clintonville", in honor of early settler James Clinton. The name "South Elgin" was adopted in 1907.

Geography 

South Elgin is located in eastern Kane County at  (41.992283, -88.307858), in the Fox River Valley. It is bordered to the north by the city of Elgin and to the east by the village of Bartlett. South Elgin sits on both sides of the Fox River.

Demographics

2020 census

Note: the US Census treats Hispanic/Latino as an ethnic category. This table excludes Latinos from the racial categories and assigns them to a separate category. Hispanics/Latinos can be of any race.

2000 Census
As of the census of 2000, there were 16,100 people, 5,565 households, and 4,307 families residing in the village. The racial makeup of the village was 86.02% White, 2.58% African American, 0.17% Native American, 5.47% Asian, 0.01% Pacific Islander, 3.88% from other races, and 1.86% from two or more races. Hispanic or Latino of any race were 10.34% of the population.

There were 5,565 households, out of which 44.3% had children under the age of 18 living with them, 66.5% were married couples living together, 7.6% had a female householder with no husband present, and 22.6% were non-families. 17.1% of all households were made up of individuals, and 3.0% had someone living alone who was 65 years of age or older.  The average household size was 2.85 and the average family size was 3.26.

In the village, the population was spread out, with 29.1% under the age of 18, 6.9% from 18 to 24, 42.1% from 25 to 44, 16.1% from 45 to 64, and 5.7% who were 65 years of age or older.  The median age was 31 years. For every 100 females, there were 100.2 males.  For every 100 females age 18 and over, there were 96.0 males.

The median income for a household in the village was $67,323, and the median income for a family was $71,190 (these figures had risen to $79,192 and $84,354 respectively as of a 2007 estimate). Males had a median income of $48,741 versus $31,486 for females. The per capita income for the village was $25,676.  About 2.1% of families and 3.0% of the population were below the poverty line, including 3.6% of those under age 18 and 2.3% of those age 65 or over.

Education
The village is served by Unit School District U46 and D303. Almost 40,000 children of school age are in its area. U-46 is second largest in Illinois.

Attractions 
 Fox River Trolley Museum

References

External links 
 Official website
 South Elgin Economic Development Council (SEED)

 
Villages in Illinois
Villages in Kane County, Illinois